Mount Clinton may refer to:

 Mount Clinton, Virginia, unincorporated community in Rockingham County, Virginia
 Mount Marshall (New York), mountain in Essex County, New York, formerly known as Mount Clinton
 Mount Pierce (New Hampshire), mountain in Coös County, New Hampshire, formerly known as Mount Clinton